C. pubescens may refer to:
 Capsicum pubescens, a plant species found in Central and South America
 Coccoloba pubescens, the grandleaf seagrape or Eve's umbrella, a plant species native to coastal regions of the Caribbean
 Crataegus pubescens (disambiguation)
 Cypripedium pubescens, the large yellow lady's slipper, yellow moccasin-flower, nerveroot, Noah's ark, American valerian or Whippoorwill's-shoe, an orchid species native to North America